Hundred High School is a public high school in Hundred, West Virginia, United States.  It is one of four high schools in the Wetzel County School District. Athletic teams compete as the Hundred Hornets in the West Virginia Secondary School Activities Commission as a member of the Ohio Valley Athletic Conference.

References

External links
 Hundred High School official webpage

Public high schools in West Virginia
Education in Wetzel County, West Virginia